Ragnar Wickström (12 November 1892 – 25 December 1950) was a Finnish footballer. He competed in the men's tournament at the 1912 Summer Olympics.

References

External links
 

1892 births
1950 deaths
Finnish footballers
Finland international footballers
Olympic footballers of Finland
Footballers at the 1912 Summer Olympics
People from Mikkeli
Association football forwards
Sportspeople from South Savo